Saudi Art Association (SAA) is a non-profit cultural society concerned with fine arts in the Kingdom of Saudi Arabia. It was established in 2007 AD - 1428 AH. The headquarter is located in Riyadh and it has other branches in Makkah, Taif, Jeddah, Asir, Yanbu, Najran, Dammam, Al-Jouf and Madinah.

Saudi Art Association is devoted to supporting Saudi artists by holding and participating in exhibitions, seminars, workshops and lectures related to arts in all regions of the Kingdom to promote their works.

Objectives 
 To support the art movement in Saudi Arabia.
 To develop the perception of art and creativity in the local community.
 To improve and strengthen the social relations inside the fine arts society.
 To create strong relations between the Saudi Art Association and other organizations inside and outside the Kingdom.
 To protect the rights of artists and their works.
 To support researchers of fine arts.
 To cooperate with government and private agencies/departments in order to help the art movement.

Works 
 Hold training courses for talented individuals in the field of fine art.
 The first meeting of the SAA was held in the headquarter under the name "Our History is an Art that Embraces the Present".
 Execute exhibitions inside and outside Saudi Arabia in cooperation with the Ministry of Culture and the Ministry of Education.
 Execute an exhibition in cooperation with King Abdulaziz Center for National Dialogue in a project to decorate the new building of the Center.
 Hold an annual exhibition in the Institute of Public Administration.
 Participate in Colors of Saudi Arabia Forum.
 Implement a cultural intellectual initiative (GSFT) that includes art activities for artists and other people interested in fine arts, in the aim of spreading awareness about fine arts in the local community.

The SAA branches

References

External links 
 

Arts in Saudi Arabia